Robert Lord may refer to:
Robert Lord (MP) (by 1495–1531 or later), MP for Great Grimsby
Robert Lord (Australian politician) (1844–1878), Member of the Queensland Legislative Assembly
Robert Lord (screenwriter) (1900–1976), American screenwriter and film producer
Bob Lord (football chairman) (1908–1981), English businessman and chairman of Burnley F.C.
Bob Lord (American football) (born 1930), American football coach
Bobby Lord (1934–2008), American country musician
Robert Lord (playwright) (1945–1992), New Zealand playwright and former Burns Fellow
Bob Lord (swimmer) (born 1945), British swimmer
Bob Lord (business executive) (born 1963), American business executive, President of AOL
Rob Lord (musician) (born 1966), London based musician and composer
Bob Lord (musician) (fl. 1989–2011), composer/producer
Bob Lord, candidate in the United States House of Representatives elections in Arizona, 2008